Alice Gardner (26 April 1854 – 11 November 1927) was an English historian. Her publications included a history of Newnham College, Cambridge.

Life
Gardner was born in Hackney, London, in 1854. She was one of six children and two her brother Ernest Arthur Gardner and Percy Gardner were noted archaeologists. At first she was educated at home but she then went to a school at Laleham created by Hannah Pipe in 1869. She went on to Newnham College in Cambridge in 1876. She was mentored by Mandell Creighton. In 1879 she came top of the history tripos with Sarah Marshall. The male students were all behind them.

She wrote and published a number of important books. The first was Synesius of Cyrene: Philosopher and Bishop which was her debut published by the SPCK in 1885. Ten years later she published Julian: Emperor and Philosopher. Studies in John the Scot was published in 1900 and Theodore of Studium: his Life and Times in 1905 and The Lascarids of Nicaea: the Story of an Empire in Exile in 1912.

After she left college she taught in Plymouth and Bedford College before she returned to lead her alma mater's history department until she first retired in 1914. World War One saw her at the Foreign Office before she took over Bristol University's history department in 1915 as their teaching staff had been drafted to war work. She wanted this university to aspire to Cambridge's older standards. In thanks she was awarded an MA degree in 1918 and she became a reader at Bristol in 1920. Cambridge was not yet authorised to award a woman a degree, but Newnham's Principal, Anne Clough, supported her research in Asia Minor and Bulgaria.

Gardner was teaching in Bristol in 1921 when Newnham celebrated its fiftieth birthday. Gardner published A Short History of Newnham College, Cambridge.

Gardner died in Warneford Hospital in Oxford in 1927.

Works
Synesius of Cyrene: Philosopher and Bishop, 1885, 
Julian: Emperor and Philosopher, 1895
Studies in John the Scot, 1900
Theodore of Studium: his Life and Times, 1905
The Lascarids of Nicaea, 1912
A Short History of Newnham College, Cambridge, 1921

References

Sources
 

British historians
British women historians
Alumni of Newnham College, Cambridge
1854 births
1927 deaths
People from Hackney Central